Military Units to Aid Production or UMAPs (Unidades Militares de Ayuda a la Producción) were agricultural forced labor camps operated by the Cuban government from November 1965 to July 1968 in the province of Camagüey. The UMAP camps served as a form of forced labor for Cubans who could not serve in the military due to being conscientious objectors, Christians and other religious people, LGBT, or political enemies of Fidel Castro or his communist revolution. The language used in the title can be misleading, as pointed out by historian Abel Sierra Madero, "The hybrid structure of work camps' military units served to camouflage the true objectives of the recruitment effort and to distance the UMAPs from the legacy of forced labor."

Many of the inmates were gay men, Jehovah's Witnesses, Seventh-day Adventists, Catholic priests and Protestant ministers, intellectuals, farmers who resisted collectivization, as well as anyone else considered "anti-social" or "counter-revolutionary". Former Intelligence Directorate agent Norberto Fuentes estimated that of approximately 35,000 internees, 507 ended up in psychiatric wards, 72 died from torture, and 180 committed suicide. A 1967-human rights report from the Organization of American States found that over 30,000 internees were "forced to work for free in state farms from 10 to 12 hours a day, from sunrise to sunset, seven days per week, poor alimentation with rice and spoiled food, unhealthy water, unclean plates, congested barracks, no electricity, latrines, no showers, inmates are given the same treatment as political prisoners." The report concludes that the UMAP camps’ two objectives were "facilitating free labor for the state" and "punishing young people who refuse to join communist organizations." The Cuban government maintained that the UMAPs were not labor camps, but part of military service.

In a 2010 interview with La Jornada, Fidel Castro admitted in response to a question about the UMAP camps that "Yes, there were moments of great injustice, great injustice!" Historically the Cuban government has presented UMAPs as a mistake, but according to Abel Sierra Madero, this institution has to be understood as part of a project of “social engineering” tailored for political and social control. Sophisticated methodologies were deployed that incorporated judicial, military, educational, medical and psychiatric apparatuses."

History

Origins
The creation of the UMAP camps themselves were initially proposed by Fidel Castro and implemented by Raúl Castro after a state visit to the Soviet Union and Bulgaria, where he learned that the Soviets ran camps for "anti-socials". According to an April 14, 1966 article in Granma, the official state newspaper, the UMAP camps were proposed at a November 1965 meeting between Fidel Castro and military leaders. Both were concerned over how to handle "misplaced elements".
<blockquote>
"Quedaba por ver el caso de una serie de elementos desubicados, vagos, que ni trabajaban, ni estudiaban. ¿Qué hacer con ellos? La cuestión era tema de preocupación para los dirigentes de la Revolución.
Un día del mes de noviembre del pasado año (1965) un grupo de oficiales se encontraban reunidos en el Estado Mayor General y discutían estas cuestiones. Hablaban con Fidel, el cual compartía esas mismas preocupaciones y le propusieron la creación de la UMAP."

"Still left to consider was the case of misplaced elements, deadbeats, those who neither studied nor worked. What can be done with these people? This question was the worrying concern for the leaders of the Revolution.
One day in November of last year, 1965, a group of military officials met to discuss these questions. They spoke with Fidel, who shared these concerns and proposed to him the creation of the UMAP."</blockquote>

The UMAP was used as a tool to allow Cuba to mimic the revolutionary changes brought about in the Soviet Union, in which large aspects of the government wanted to craft its citizens into an "obedient" labour force.

Operations
Interning citizens
The main recogidas ("round ups") of UMAP internees occurred in November 1965 and June 1965. Another large recogida occurred after an airplane engineer for Cubana Airlines attempted to hijack an airplane in March 1966, which resulted in the firing of many airline employees and their sentencing to UMAP camps even without any connection to the hijacking.

One of the most common ways that individuals were taken to UMAP camps was through a false notice to appear for military service, which became obligatory with the establishment of the draft on November 12, 1963 through Law No. 1129. Individuals would receive a telegram with a notice to appear at a given location for SMO ("Servicio Militar Obligatorio," Obligatory Military Service). Instead of being taken to an actual military camp to receive training for the army, they would be transported by train, truck, or bus to agricultural UMAP labor camps which were located in Camagüey, a former province on the eastern end of the island. Conditions on the up to 8 hour trip across the island were poor, with internees provided with little clean water, food, or facilities.

Many interviewees in the documentary Improper Conduct report that the police rounded up people directly off the streets into buses to be taken to UMAP camps. This method of selection into UMAP camps appears to have been more common for effeminate gay men and "anti-socials" such as "hippies."

Camp activity
UMAP camps typically held 120 internees, split up into squads of ten. Each UMAP camp typically consisted of three barracks, two for internees and one for military personnel. Camps had no running water or electricity.

Internees at the UMAP camps received no military training and were given no arms. Their uniform was blue pants, a denim shirt, and boots. The labor the internees performed consisted of a variety of agricultural tasks, from tearing down the marabou plant to picking fruit, but they mostly engaged in the cutting of sugar cane.

Many of the military personnel who ran the camps were illiterate or semi-illiterate soldiers. The Cuban government assigned these undereducated soldiers to UMAP camps because they were trying to professionalize the Cuban military.

Every squad of ten was led by a cabo ("corporal") who was one of the inmates. The cabo was in charge of tasks such as showing their squad where to work, but still wore the same uniform as other internees and still had to perform agricultural labor.

Each camp also had an accountant who was chosen from amongst the inmates. The accountant was in charge of keeping track of the amount of work each internee completed.

Lastly, each camp had a suministro, also an internee, who was in charge of bringing food rations from a central military barrack back to their respective UMAP camp, where the suministro would distribute food amongst fellow internees. The suministro would have to carefully allocate the food amongst internees or else they would run out of food before the end of the month. Former suministros from UMAP camps report that military officials did not provide enough food so that they could take the remaining foodstuffs back home or sell them to people in the countryside (guajiros).

Internees were divided by category, into camps for gay men and camps for everyone else. The internees were often divided by category (Jehovah’s Witnesses, gay men, Catholics, etc.) en route to the camps and also at the camps themselves, where homosexuals and effeminate men would often be selected from one camp to another especially for homosexuals.
There are many reports of physical abuse at the camps, especially directed towards Jehovah’s Witnesses. Among the many forms of abuse, former internees report Jehovah’s Witnesses being beaten, threatened with execution, stuffed with dirt in their mouths, buried in the ground until their neck, and tied up naked outside in barbed wire without food or water until fainting. Emilio Bejel, author of Gay Cuban Nation, wrote that some of the officials who ran the camps were executed due to how badly they mistreated the inmates. Nevertheless, the state-run Granma newspaper reported: 
"When the first groups, which were nothing good, began to arrive, some officers didn't have either the necessary patience or the required experience and lost their temper. For these reasons, some officers were submitted to a court-martial. In some cases they were demoted and, in other ones [cases] they were expelled from the Armed Forces (Granma, April 14, 1966).

Some internees mutilated themselves so they could be transferred from the camp.

Third-party testimonies
Paul Kidd, a Canadian foreign news correspondent, provides the only known first-hand, third party account of the UMAP camps. Kidd traveled to Cuba on August 29, 1966 to write for Southam News Service. On September 8, the Cuban foreign ministry asked him to leave "by the first flight" because he took photographs of anti-aircraft guns visible from his hotel room window and "exhibited an incorrect attitude toward the revolution" in an article he had published earlier.

During this trip, Kidd departed Havana and wandered through the rural, former province of Camaguey where he encountered a UMAP labor camp near the hamlet of El Dos de Cespedes. The barbed-wire enclosed camp was run by 10 security guards and held 120 internees, consisting of Jehovah's Witnesses, Roman Catholics, and "those loosely termed 'social misfits' by the government". The ages of the inmates ranged from 16 years old to over 60. None of the internees were given arms; all weapons at the camp were under the control of the ten guards running the camp. The internees worked an average of 60 hours a week for a monthly income of 7 pesos (roughly worth a meal) and their internment typically lasted for at least six months. Cubans who served in the standard SMO ("Servicio Militar Obligatorio", Obligatory Military Service) received the same monthly wage of 7 pesos a month.

As long as their agricultural quotas were met, most internees at the camp were allowed a break to visit family after six months of internment. Family members were allowed to visit internees at the camp on the second Sunday of each month and could bring personal items such as cigarettes to internees. Internees at the camp Kidd discovered were housed in two long, white concrete buildings with no windows just the hole in the wall which had bunk beds with sacks slung between wooden beams for mattresses. After agricultural work was complete, internees were instructed in communist ideology for two hours every night. Kidd estimated that about 200 such camps existed and in total housed about 30,000 people.

Legacy
The direct effects of UMAP's are still felt in Cuba's homosexual and youth communities to the modern day, with the proliferation of Cuba as a direct result of them. Contemporary authors like Lillian Guerra believe the reason for the creation of the UMAP's to rest on the need for the communist government to insert itself directly in the personal lives of its citizens, and through that then use gender and sexuality to eliminate "idealogical diversionism". Allowing the state room to progress into a centralised and cohesive unit for the propagation of communism by taking direct control over the lives of the population.

Yet, the history of the UMAP's is still regarded as a tragedy in Cuba, with Fidel Castro even stating categorically about the UMAP's, “I can tell you for sure that there was prejudice against homosexuals". But it had not been enough to simply acknowledge the mistakes made by the nation in the past, rather since their dissolution in 1968 Cuba has made significant strides in supporting its homosexual and youth communities. Through the use of sex education campaigns and the empowerment of gay communities through their open visibility, Cuba was able to turnover its inherited "macho" conceptions. With the homosexual community taking a paramount role in the proliferation of art and culture during the 70s and 80s through the support of the government, with some even taking prominent roles as leaders in large aspects of communist governance, championed as evidence of revolutionary non-discrimination. The sex education campaign brought an understanding of sexuality to the forefront of schooling, building in an acceptance of sexualities and effectively cutting off colonialist mentalities by educating the population into a different cultural paradigm. A key example of how this was implemented was the AIDS crisis, in which the Cuban government actively worked to help those affected with "the Cuban public health system allocating $2 million for the National HIV/
AIDS Prevention and Control Program". Not only that but Cubans with AIDS were given full checks, even if they weren't able to work and a host of other resources like medications, treatments, housing and hospital coverage for free. Providing us with a direct understanding of changes made because of the UMAP's and their legacy, and how Cuba was able completely reform itself to the degree that it could publicly celebrate its diverse communities, providing us with an understanding of the considerable progression Cuba has made away from its colonial legacy.

Notable inmates
Cardinal Jaime Ortega, Catholic Archbishop of the Archdiocese of Havana from 1981 to 2016
Carlos L. Alas, son of Carlos Alas del Casino. Cuban singer and songwriter
Pablo Milanes, Cuban singer and songwriter
Félix Luis Viera, Cuban writer currently living in Mexico and author of book about UMAP experiences
Héctor Santiago, Cuban playwright

In popular cultureFresa y Chocolate – 1994 Cuban film which deals with the discrimination LGBT people faced after the Revolution, also brieftly mentions the UMAP camps.
"El Pecado Original" – song by Pablo Milanes, considered a homage to remember the mistakes made in post-Revolution Cuba towards LGBT people.Before Night Falls – autobiography by Reinaldo Arenas, deals with theme of UMAP camps.

Documentaries and books
 Improper Conduct (in Spanish: Conducta impropia) – 1984 documentary by Néstor Almendros and Orlando Jiménez-Leal A book published in Spanish as Conducta impropia has the transcriptions of all testimonies appearing in the film and others never used.
 La UMAP: El Gulag Castrista – 2004 book by Enrique Ros
 Un Ciervo Herido (A Wounded Deer) – book by Félix Luis Viera
 UMAP: Una Muerte a Plazos – book by José Caballero

References

Bibliography

External links
 Joseph Tahbaz: Demystifying las UMAP: The Politics of Sugar, Gender, and Religion in 1960s Cuba. In: Delaware Review of Latin American Studies Vol 14 No 2, 31 December 2013
Abel Sierra Madero: “‘El Trabajo Os Hará Hombres’: Masculinización Nacional, Trabajo Forzado y Control Social En Cuba Durante Los Años Sesenta.” Cuban Studies, no. 44, 2016, pp. 309–349.
Abel Sierra Madero: "Academias para producir machos en Cuba." Letras Libres, 21 January 2016.
Héctor Maseda. "Los trabajos forzados en Cuba." Encuentro de la Cultura Cubana'' (2001): 224-227.
Samuel Farber: Cuba in 1968 "https://jacobinmag.com/2018/04/cuba-1968-fidel-castro-revolution-repression".

Labor in Cuba
Penal labour
LGBT rights in Cuba
Homophobia
Human rights abuses in Cuba
Unfree labour
Camagüey Province
1960s in Cuba
1965 establishments in Cuba
1968 disestablishments in Cuba
Military history of Cuba
Persecution of LGBT people
Internment camps
Fidel Castro